Rohan Sabharwal (born Rohan Ajay Sabharwal on 10 October 1979) is an Indian filmmaker.

Family life and education 

Sabharwal was born in the city of Mumbai. He is the elder of two sons born to a Punjabi father and a Catholic mother of mixed  Goan-Portuguese and Anglo-Irish descent. He finished his schooling at the Lawrence School, Lovedale in 1996. He is a graduate of the London Film School, London, UK under the guidance of Oscar-nominated Mike Leigh O.B.E.

Film career 

After graduating from film school in 2006, the same year that he edited the award winning commercial 'Sarah and Wendy' which won the  Kodak Student Commercial Award in the UK, he left London to pursue a career in film and television in India. Here he shot his 16-minute graduation film Shunyata, which premiered at the ICA cinema in London and generated mixed reviews, though most were favorable.

He became widely recognized as a filmmaker after the Celebrate Bandra Committee picked his 25-minute short Romson and Juliana to show at their biennial festival Celebrate Bandra in 2007. 

His most recent film is the first episode of a television documentary series called India Rediscovered, inspired by Jawaharlal Nehru's book The Discovery of India. The series proposes to cover places of historic importance in India that have been ignored by text books.

Filmography

Social causes 
Supporter and Member of Amnesty International

Sources 
http://www.imdb.com/name/nm3290534/
http://film.britishcouncil.org/shunyata
http://www.imdb.com/name/nm3290534/
http://www.dnaindia.com/lifestyle/report_film-your-life_1285980
http://documentaries.documentaryfilms.net/India-Rediscovered-2008.html
http://www.cultureunplugged.com/play/703/Shunyata
http://www.cultureunplugged.com/play/1146/India-Rediscovered/Vm0xMFlWWXhTbkpQVm1SU1lrVndVbFpyVWtKUFVUMDkr
http://www.cnngo.com/mumbai/none/presents-698673
http://gulfnews.com/news/world/india/reel-touch-to-reality-1.705487

Living people
Film directors from Mumbai
Indian filmmakers
1979 births